Lee Jae-ho is a South Korean male curler.

Teams

References

External links

Living people
South Korean male curlers
Curlers at the 2007 Asian Winter Games
Medalists at the 2007 Asian Winter Games
Asian Games medalists in curling
Asian Games gold medalists for South Korea
Year of birth missing (living people)
21st-century South Korean people